This is a list of notable people that were born in, or who have lived in, Berkeley, California. Located in the San Francisco Bay area and near Oakland, it includes people who attended Berkeley High School, but not people that attended University of California, Berkeley unless they achieved notoriety while in attendance, and were also residents of the city at the time.

Academia

Actors

Chefs, cookbook authors

Crime

Visual artists and designers

Business leaders and entrepreneurs

Filmmakers

Journalists, news media

Musicians

Politicians, activists, political figures and civil servants

Scientists, researchers

Sports

Writers, poets

Other

See also

List of Berkeley High School (Berkeley, California) people
List of Nobel laureates associated with University of California, Berkeley
List of University of California, Berkeley faculty
List of University of California, Berkeley alumni
 List of people from Oakland, California
 List of people from San Francisco

References

 
Berkeley, California
Lists of people from California